Keith Walton (born 1953) is a male British former swimmer.

Swimming career
Walton represented England and won a bronze medal in the 4 x 100 freestyle relay event, at the 1974 British Commonwealth Games in Christchurch, New Zealand. He also participated in the 100 metres freestyle  and swam for the Belle Vue Swimming Club in Consett.

References

1953 births
Living people
British male swimmers
Swimmers at the 1974 British Commonwealth Games
Commonwealth Games medallists in swimming
Commonwealth Games bronze medallists for England
British male freestyle swimmers
Medallists at the 1974 British Commonwealth Games